Phragmacossia ihlei is a species of moth of the family Cossidae. It is found in Thailand.

References

Moths described in 2008
Zeuzerinae